Jessica Priest is a fictional character from the Spawn universe. Specifically, Priest serves as a substitute in the Spawn film for Chapel, Al Simmons's killer in the comic book. Priest was played by Melinda Clarke in the film. She would later become the second She-Spawn and leader of the team called Scorched.

Publication history
The character of Chapel (originally from the comic book series Youngblood) could not be used in the Spawn movie because the rights to the character were owned by Rob Liefeld. McFarlane created Priest as a replacement for Chapel in the film and later had Priest retconned to be Spawn's killer in the comic as well. Some of her background is revealed in Curse of the Spawn #12-14.

Fictional history
Jessica Priest works as an assassin for Spawn's nemesis Jason Wynn. Prior to shooting Simmons, she searches South America for a biogenetic weapon for her boss.
She later appears in the Curse of Spawn series where she is revealed to have a husband and two stepchildren. She later returns in #298 where she is seen talking to Nyx about Al Simmons and the forces of Hell trying to hunt down. Later on she would become a hellspawn herself.

In other media

 Priest was portrayed by Melinda Clarke in the 1997 film adaptation Spawn. She was intended to return as another Spawn; but the film had neither the time nor the budget so it was canceled.
 Priest appears in the 1999 video game Spawn, voiced by Diana Salles.
 Priest appears in the video game Spawn: In the Demon's Hand, voiced by Erin McMurphy.
 McFarlane Toys has made several action figures of Priest.

References

Fictional mercenaries in comics
Fictional assassins in comics
Fictional female assassins
Characters created by Todd McFarlane
Spawn characters
Image Comics female superheroes
Image Comics female supervillains
Comics characters introduced in 1997
Superhero film characters
Female characters in comics
Female characters in film
Fictional women soldiers and warriors